Yasmina Aziez (born 23 January 1991) is a French taekwondo athlete.

She represented France at the 2016 Summer Olympics in Rio de Janeiro, in the women's 49 kg. In this category she won a bronze medal at the world championships in Copenhagen.

References

External links

1991 births
Living people
French female taekwondo practitioners
Olympic taekwondo practitioners of France
Taekwondo practitioners at the 2016 Summer Olympics
European Games competitors for France
Taekwondo practitioners at the 2015 European Games
World Taekwondo Championships medalists
European Taekwondo Championships medalists
21st-century French women